The Tony Award for Best Performance by a Leading Actor in a Musical is awarded to the actor who was voted as the best actor in a musical play, whether a new production or a revival.  The award has been given since 1948, but the nominees who did not win have only been publicly announced since 1956.

Winners and nominees

1940s

1950s

1960s

1970s

1980s

1990s

2000s

2010s

2020s

Award records

Multiple wins
 2 Wins
 Norbert Leo Butz
 John Cullum
 Richard Kiley
 Nathan Lane
 Zero Mostel
 James Naughton
 Robert Preston
 George Rose
 Phil Silvers

Multiple nominations

 4 Nominations
 John Cullum
 Raul Julia

 3 Nominations
 Len Cariou
 Michael Cerveris
 Alfred Drake
 Joel Grey
 George Hearn
 Gregory Hines
 Richard Kiley
 Nathan Lane
 Brian Stokes Mitchell
 Robert Morse
 Robert Preston
 George Rose
 Phil Silvers

 2 Nominations
 Herschel Bernardi
 Ray Bolger
 Barry Bostwick
 Alex Brightman
 Matthew Broderick
 Danny Burstein
 Norbert Leo Butz
 David Carroll
 Brent Carver
 Jack Cassidy
 Gavin Creel
 Tim Curry
 Jim Dale
 Santino Fontana
 Victor Garber
 Joshua Henry
 Hugh Jackman
 Brian d'Arcy James
 Andy Karl
 John Lithgow
 Terrence Mann
 Rob McClure
 John McMartin
 Lin-Manuel Miranda
 Zero Mostel
 James Naughton
 Jerry Orbach
 Mandy Patinkin
 David Hyde Pierce
 Martin Short
 Robert Weede
 Patrick Wilson
 Tom Wopat

Multiple character wins
 3 Wins
 Pseudolus from A Funny Thing Happened on the Way to the Forum

 2 Wins
 Albin from La Cage aux Folles
 Emile de Becque from South Pacific
 J. Pierrepont Finch from How to Succeed in Business Without Really Trying

Multiple character nominations

 5 Nominations
 Tevye from Fiddler on the Roof

 3 Nominations
 Albin from La Cage aux Folles
 Noble Eggleston / Val du Val / Fred Poitrine from  Little Me *
 Harold Hill from The Music Man
 Henry Higgins from My Fair Lady
 Pseudolus from A Funny Thing Happened on the Way to the Forum
 Sweeney Todd from Sweeney Todd

 2 Nominations
 Billy Flynn from Chicago
 Bobby from Company
 Charley Wykeham from Where's Charley?
 Chuck Baxter from Promises, Promises
 Curly McLain from Oklahoma!
 Don Quixote / Cervantes from Man of La Mancha
 Dr. Pangloss from Candide
 Emile de Becque from South Pacific
 Fagin from Oliver!
 Georg Nowack from She Loves Me
 George from La Cage aux Folles
 Georges from Sunday in the Park with George
 Guido Contini from Nine
 Horace Vandergelder from Hello, Dolly!
 J. Pierrepont Finch from How to Succeed in Business Without Really Trying
 Jean Valjean from Les Misérables
 The King of Siam from The King and I
 Marvin from Falsettos
 Mr. Applegate from Damn Yankees
 Nathan Detroit from Guys and Dolls
 Amos Pinchley / Otto Schnitzler / Prince Cherney / Noble Junior from  Little Me *
 Porgy from Porgy and Bess
 Tony from The Most Happy Fella

-*Most of the leading male characters in Little Me are played by the same actor, but the actual roles vary.  In the original 1962 Broadway production and the 1998 revival, Sid Caesar and Martin Short (respectively) played Noble Eggleston, Amos Pinchley, Val du Val, Fred Poitrine, Otto Schnitzler, and Prince Cherney.  Caesar also played Noble Junior.  In the 1981 revival, the lead roles were split among James Coco and Victor Garber with Garber playing Noble Eggleston, Val du Val, Fred Poitrine, and Noble Junior.

Productions with multiple nominations
 Damn Yankees – Ray Walston (winner) and Stephen Douglass
 Take Me Along – Jackie Gleason (winner), Robert Morse, and Walter Pidgeon
 Two Gentlemen of Verona – Clifton Davis and Raul Julia
 My Fair Lady – George Rose (winner) and Ian Richardson
 The Pirates of Penzance – Kevin Kline (winner) and George Rose
 La Cage aux Folles – George Hearn (winner) and Gene Barry
 Les Misérables – Terrence Mann and Colm Wilkinson
 Jerome Robbins' Broadway – Jason Alexander (winner) and Robert La Fosse
 Starmites – Gabriel Barre and Brian Lane Green (Jerome Robbins' Broadway and Starmites were competing in the same year)
 City of Angels – James Naughton (winner) and Gregg Edelman
 Show Boat – Mark Jacoby and John McMartin
 Ragtime – Peter Friedman and Brian Stokes Mitchell
 The Producers – Nathan Lane (winner) and Matthew Broderick
 Dirty Rotten Scoundrels – Norbert Leo Butz (winner) and John Lithgow
 Monty Python's Spamalot – Hank Azaria and Tim Curry (Dirty Rotten Scoundrels and Monty Python's Spamalot were competing in the same year)
 La Cage aux Folles – Douglas Hodge (winner) and Kelsey Grammer (the second time this show received two nominations)
 The Book of Mormon – Josh Gad and Andrew Rannells
 Follies – Danny Burstein and Ron Raines
 Kinky Boots – Billy Porter (winner) and Stark Sands
 A Gentleman's Guide to Love and Murder – Jefferson Mays and Bryce Pinkham
 Hamilton – Lin-Manuel Miranda and Leslie Odom Jr. (winner)

Multiple awards and nominations
Actors who have been nominated multiple times in any acting categories

References

External links

Tony Award, Actor in A Musical, at Internet Broadway Database

Tony Awards
Theatre acting awards
Awards established in 1948
1948 establishments in the United States